Robert Curran may refer to:

 Robert Curran (Canadian politician) (1883–1958), politician in Manitoba, Canada
 Robert Curran (dancer), Australian dancer and choreographer, artistic director of Louisville Ballet
 Robert Curran (physician) (1921–2006), British pathologist
 Robert Curran (Scottish politician) (1923–1995), Scottish nationalist activist
 Robert T. Curran (1921–1977), American college baseball and basketball player and coach
 Robert W. Curran (born 1950), Maryland politician